The 2009 South American Ski Mountaineering Championship was the third edition of a South American continental championship of competition ski mountaineering, and the first that was sanctioned by the International Ski Mountaineering Federation (ISMF), which emerged from the International Council for Ski Mountaineering Competitions (ISMC) in 2008. Furthermore, the competition was sanctioned by the Unión Panamericana de Montaña y Escalada (UPAME).

The event, carried out at Villa La Angostura from 22 to 23 August 2009, was organized by the Federación Argentina de Ski y Andinismo (FASA), the Club Andino Bariloche (CAB) and the local Club Andino Villa La Angostura (CAVLA). Participating were racers from Argentina and Chile as well as two French competitors, that did not appear in the continental ranking.

Results 
Event was held on the Cerro Bayo on August 23, 2009.

List of the best 10 participants by gender:

*) The French racers Jérôme Pezet (01h 03' 44") and Olivier Levasseur (01h 03' 45") finished first and second, but were no South American nationals.

External links 
 III Campeonato Sudamericano de Esquí de Montaña , Club Andino Villa La Angostura

References 

2009
South American Ski Mountaineering Championship
South American Ski Mountaineering Championship
Sport in Neuquén Province
S
Skiing in Argentina